Ilirska Bistrica (before 1927: Bisterza, Hungarian: Illírbeszterce) is a town in the Inner Carniola region of southwestern Slovenia. It is the administrative seat of the Municipality of Ilirska Bistrica.

Name
The name Ilirska Bistrica means 'Illyrian Bistrica', it has its origin during the times of the Austrian Empire, when the area was part of the Kingdom of Illyria, an administrative unit between 1816 and 1849. The adjective Ilirska was added to the old name Bistrica (Feistritz), differentiating it from other towns in the general area such as Feistritz im Rosental or Slovenska Bistrica.

The town's coat of arms represents the history of the region, recalling the pre-Slavic Illyrian people that once populated the area, along with their shipbuilding past. The town's current coat of arms was adopted in the mid-19th century and is only a slight modification of the coat of arms of the Kingdom of Illyria.

Geography
The town centre is located on the ancient road from Postojna and Pivka to Rijeka on the Adriatic coast. It is situated in the valley of the Reka River, on the steep rim of the densely wooded Snežnik plateau in the northeast. In the southwest, the Brkini Hills form the natural border with the Slovene Littoral (Slovene Istria) historical region.

History

In the 12th century a fortress was erected at the site of a prehistoric settlement on a hill east of the town centre, when the area was part of the Imperial March of Carniola. The castle later was held by the Counts of Duino, from the 14th century onwards by the princely House of Auersperg in Postojna.

The settlement of Ilirska Bistrica itself was first mentioned about 1300; its advantageous location, the surrounding karst springs and extended forests promoted the economic development of numerous sawmills and a flourishing timber trade from the early 15th century onwards. Located in the Duchy of Carniola the town for centuries was part of the Habsburg monarchy. In the 19th century, the Ilirska Bistrica wood merchants mainly supplied the Austrian seaports of Trieste and Rijeka. In 1873 a railway line was opened by the Austrian Southern Railway company, running from Pivka and the Southern Railway line via the Ilirska Bistrica railway station to the coastal cities of Opatija and Rijeka.

Within the last 100 years, the town's history has been primarily shaped by the nations that it has belonged to. Ilirska Bistrica became part of the Austrian part of the Austro-Hungarian Empire in 1867, it was annexed by the Kingdom of Italy in 1920, it became part of Yugoslavia after World War II, and today it belongs to independent Slovenia. Remnants of these various states can still be seen in numerous monuments, the railway station, and the Italian barracks from the Second World War.

During last days of World War II, the 97th Army Corps under command of German General der Gebirgstruppe Ludwig Kübler were defending the defensive area between Rijeka and Mount Snežnik, also known as Ingridstellung or defensive line Ingrid. Their task was to halt the Yugoslav advance toward Trieste and Ljubljana, threatening the rear of both Army Groups C and E.
The 97th Army Corps became encircled in area around Ilirska Bistrica and Mount Snežnik, when Tito ordered the 4th Army to bypass the 97th Corps and capture Trieste. Only after the Partisans captured Trieste was the 97th Corps ordered to break through toward Iliriska Bistrica, Postojna, and Ljubljana. The breakthrough began on the night of May 2 in a hedgehog formation. During May 5 and 6, the corps managed to capture Iliriska Bistrica, but further advance become impossible and on May 7 at 6:04 am a capitulation was signed. Around 16,000 soldiers, 40 senior officers, and three generals become prisoners of war. Captured equipment included 31 tanks, 841 artillery pieces, 536 mortars, 1,670 machine-guns, 2,468 light machine-guns, and 716 various motor vehicles.

The neighboring village of Trnovo was annexed by Ilirska Bistrica in 1952.

On June 27, 1991, during the Ten-Day War, the Slovenian Territorial Defence blocked the road connecting Rijeka and its 13th Infantry Corps of Yugoslav People's Army with the interior of Slovenia. Later on the same day, the Slovenian Territorial Defence launched an attack on a Yugoslav People's Army column in Koseze near Ilirska Bistrica. After fierce fighting between the Slovenian Territorial Defence and Yugoslav People's Army, the Yugoslav People's Army retreated. The battle resulted in three dead Yugoslav People's Army soldiers and several wounded soldiers on both sides.

Mass graves

Ilirska Bistrica is the site of two known mass graves from the Second World War. It contained the remains of German soldiers from the 97th Corps that fell at the beginning of May 1945. The grave has been exhumed. The Cemetery Mass Grave is located next to the town cemetery. It contains the remains of 82 German soldiers buried in a former firing trench. An asphalt road and parking lot were laid over the grave when the cemetery was expanded.

Notable people
Dragotin Kette (1876–1899), poet
 (1913–1983), Yugoslav Partisan hero, later general-colonel in People's Liberation Army of Yugoslavia
 (1903–1999), historian
Dragan Živadinov (born 1960), theatre director

Church
The parish church in the town is dedicated to Saint Peter and belongs to the Koper Diocese. It stands in the former village of Trnovo. A second church in the town is dedicated to Saint George.

Recreation
The town is used by tourists and trekkers as a starting point for travelling to the top of the Snežnik Plateau, a day-long round trip from Ilirska Bistrica. At , the plateau's highest peak, Big Mount Snežnik, is the highest non-Alpine peak in Slovenia.

Sports

Basketball
Ilirska Bistrica is the hometown of the KK Plama Pur basketball club, which competes in the Slovenian Second Basketball League.

Football
Ilirska Bistrica is the hometown of the NK Ilirska Bistrica football club, which competes in the Slovenian Third League.

Other sports
Ilirska Bistrica also has several other clubs and associations, such as the Ilirska Bistrica Handball Club, several karate clubs, and an archery club.

References

External links

 Ilirska Bistrica on Geopedia
  Ilirska Bistrica municipal site 

Populated places in the Municipality of Ilirska Bistrica
Cities and towns in the Slovene Littoral
Use of the term Illyrian in modern history